Patriarch John of Constantinople may refer to:

 Patriarch John I of Constantinople, Archbishop in 398–404
 Patriarch John II of Constantinople, Ecumenical Patriarch in 518–520
 Patriarch John III of Constantinople, Ecumenical Patriarch in 565–577
 Patriarch John IV of Constantinople, Ecumenical Patriarch in 582–595
 Patriarch John V of Constantinople, Ecumenical Patriarch in 669–675
 Patriarch John VI of Constantinople, Ecumenical Patriarch in 712–715
 Patriarch John VII of Constantinople, Ecumenical Patriarch in 837–843
 Patriarch John VIII of Constantinople, Ecumenical Patriarch in 1064–1075
 Patriarch John IX of Constantinople, Ecumenical Patriarch in 1111–1134
 Patriarch John X of Constantinople, Ecumenical Patriarch in 1198–1206
 Patriarch John XI of Constantinople, Ecumenical Patriarch in 1275–1282
 Patriarch John XII of Constantinople, Ecumenical Patriarch in 1294–1303
 Patriarch John XIII of Constantinople, Ecumenical Patriarch in 1315–1320
 Patriarch John XIV of Constantinople, Ecumenical Patriarch in 1334–1347